Two vessels have served the British Royal Navy as HMS Resolue, the French from "Resolute". Both were captured French ships:

 HMS Resolue was the French Iphigénie-class frigate  of 32 guns  launched in 1778 that the British Royal Navy captured in 1798; HMS Resolue served as a slops ship and a receiving ship at Portsmouth until she was broken up in 1811.
  was the Spanish xebec O Hydra, that the French captured in 1794 and renamed Résolue in 1795. The British captured her in 1795; she was last listed in 1802.

See also
 
 

Royal Navy ship names